Chotětov is a market town in Mladá Boleslav District in the Central Bohemian Region of the Czech Republic. It has about 1,400 inhabitants.

Administrative parts
The village of Hřivno is an administrative part of Chotětov.

Geography
It lies in a flat landscape of the Jizera Table.

History
The first written mention of Chotětov is from 1057, when Duke Spytihněv II donated the village to the newly established Litoměřice Chapter. After the town of Bělá pod Bezdězem was founded in 1337, it became property of the town. From 1587 until the establishment of independent municipal administration in 1850, Chotětov was part of the Brandýs estate.

Transport
Chotětov is located on a railway line leading from Prague to Turnov.

Sights
The main landmark of Chotětov is the Church of Saint Procopius. It was built in the late Gothic style in 1546.

References

External links

Populated places in Mladá Boleslav District
Market towns in the Czech Republic